Acytolepis ripte is a butterfly of the family Lycaenidae. It is found on Borneo.

References

, 1895. A monograph of the Bornean Lycaenidae, Proceedings of the Zoological Society of London. 1895: 556-267, 4 pls.
 , 1983. Blue Butterflies of the Lycaenopsis Group: 1-309, 6 pls. London.

Butterflies described in 1895
Acytolepis
Butterflies of Borneo